Philippe Bas (born 20 July 1958) is a French politician, member of the French Senate representing the department of Manche.

He was appointed general secretary of the Élysée Palace from 2002 to 2005. Since 2014, he is the president of the Commission des Lois in the French Senate. Between July 2018 and February 2019, he was the president of the Senate commission which investigated the Benalla affair, chiefly on the organization of the French presidency about security subjects.

References

1958 births
Living people
Politicians from Paris
The Republicans (France) politicians
Government ministers of France
French Senators of the Fifth Republic
Sciences Po alumni
École nationale d'administration alumni
Members of the Conseil d'État (France)
Chevaliers of the Légion d'honneur
Senators of Manche